Daniel Sunderland (born 16 February 1989) is a Canadian bobsledder who competes in the two-man and four-man events as a driver.

Career
In January 2022, Sunderland was named to Canada's 2022 Olympic team.

References

1989 births
Living people
Canadian male bobsledders
People from Fort McMurray
Bobsledders at the 2022 Winter Olympics
Olympic bobsledders of Canada